The discography of the English alternative rock trio Doves comprises five studio albums, sixteen singles, and seven EPs, as well as a best-of compilation album, a B-sides compilation, and a full-length DVD compilation. After self-releasing their first three EPs on Casino Records, the band signed to Heavenly Recordings and released their debut album Lost Souls in April 2000. The album reached number 16 on the UK Albums Chart, and has since been certified platinum by the British Phonographic Industry. Their second album The Last Broadcast was even more successful upon its release in April 2002, reaching number 1 on the charts and yielding the band's highest-charting single to date, "There Goes the Fear", which peaked at number 3 on the UK Singles Chart. The album has also been certified platinum by the BPI. In February 2005, Doves released their third studio album Some Cities, which again topped the albums chart at number 1, and produced the hit single "Black and White Town", which charted at number 6, and the minor hit "Snowden", which peaked at number 17.

Following worldwide tours throughout 2005, the band took a break, which saw singer/bassist Jimi Goodwin providing drums on the songs "Mathematics" and "People Help the People" by Bolton-based indie pop band Cherry Ghost, and drummer Andy Williams becoming a father for the first time in September 2007. The band reconvened and began recording throughout 2007 and 2008. Their anticipated fourth album Kingdom of Rust was released in April 2009, peaking at number 2 on the albums chart. The album yielded two singles: "Kingdom of Rust" and "Winter Hill", the latter of which marked the first time a single by the band did not enter the top 100 of the Singles Chart. Worldwide tours coincided with the releases, including an appearance at the BBC Electric Proms festival accompanied by the London Bulgarian Choir in October 2009.

A best–of compilation, entitled The Places Between: The Best of Doves, was released in April 2010 and peaked at number 12 on the albums chart. The single "Andalucia" preceded the album in March 2010.

Following the release of The Places Between, Doves announced they would be taking an indefinite hiatus, during which time Jimi Goodwin released his debut solo album Odludek and the Williams brothers regrouped as Black Rivers and released an eponymous album. Then, in 2019, Doves reunited for a special charity gig, whereupon rumours of the band recording new material began to circulate. On 18 June 2020, the band released their first music in ten years with a song titled "Carousels". Another track, "Prisoners", followed one month later. Simultaneously, the band announced their fifth studio album, The Universal Want, which was released on 11 September 2020, with third single "Cathedrals of the Mind" preceding the album's release on 27 August 2020. The Universal Want became the band's third album to top the UK Albums Chart at number 1.

Studio albums

Notes

Compilation albums

Extended plays

Singles

Notes

Promo-only singles and special releases

Notes
 A ^ "Spaceface" (Live at the Eden Sessions) was issued as a promo-only CD prior to the release of Where We're Calling From and was not given a commercial release.
 B ^ "Black Circus of Prague" and "Black and White Town" (David Holmes Remix) were issued on a limited edition promo-only 7" single prior to the release of the "Snowden" single.
 C ^ Instrumental versions of all 11 tracks on Kingdom of Rust; released exclusively as a digital download.
 D ^ "House of Mirrors" was canceled as the album's third single.
 E ^ Aeroplane's remix of "Brazil" was rumoured to be the B-side of the "House of Mirrors" single.

Live albums
Doves performed live at The Eden Sessions on 2 July 2010. The set was recorded and burned to CD-R, and made available for sale on Doves' official website as a digital download or limited edition 2CD-R set shortly thereafter.

Live at The Eden Sessions 2 July 2010

DVDs
 "Pounding" (22 July 2002) - DVD single
 Where We're Calling From (29 September 2003) - full length DVD
 Some Cities (21 February 2005) (special edition version of album with extra video documentary) - DVD
 "Sky Starts Falling" (12 September 2005) - DVD single
 Kingdom of Rust (6 April 2009) (video documentary on the making of the album; also includes "House of Mirrors" music video) - exclusive to NME.com
 The Places Between: The Best of Doves (5 April 2010) (deluxe edition includes a bonus DVD featuring all 13 of the band's music videos from 1998 to 2009)

Music videos

B-sides

Lost Souls B-sides
 "Zither"
 "Break Me Gently" (Incidental)
 "Darker"
 "Meet Me at the Pier"
 "Acoustic No.1"
 "Karen"
 "Valley"
 "Down to Sea" (demo of "Sea Song")
 "Crunch"
 "Lost in Watts"
 "Rise" (Live Triple J at The Wireless)
 "Suitenoise"
 "Your Shadow Lay Across My Life"
 "Firesuite" (Noise Version)

The Last Broadcast B-sides
 "Hit the Ground Running"
 "Here It Comes" (Live Triple J at The Wireless)
 "The Cedar Room" (Live Triple J at The Wireless)
 "Far from Grace"
 "Northenden"
 "Willow's Song" (edit)
 "Willow's Song" (full length version)
 "M62 Song" (Four Tet Remix)
 "Satellites" (Soulsavers Remix)
 "The Sulphur Man" (Rebelski Remix)
 "Where We're Calling From" (Kieran Hebden Bridge Remix)

Some Cities B-sides
 "45"
 "At the Tower"
 "Eleven Miles Out"
 "Black Circus of Prague"
 "Son of a Builder"
 "Black and White Town" (David Holmes Remix)
 "Almost Forgot Myself" (Doves vs. 69Corp Mix)
 "Some Cities" (Echoboy Remix)
 "The Storm" (Rebelski Remix)
 "Some Cities" (Love Will Never Sever Mix by Echoboy)

Kingdom of Rust B-sides

 "Push Me On"
 "Ship of Fools"
 "The Last Son"
 "Brazil"
 "Kingdom of Rust" (Acoustic)
 "Winter Hill" (Acoustic)
 "Jetstream" (Acoustic)
 "Birds Flew Backwards" (Alternative Version)
 "Birds Flew Backwards" (Chris Watson Version)

Remixes
 "Kingdom of Rust" (Prins Thomas Diskomiks)
 "Kingdom of Rust" (Prins Thomas Diskomiks Instrumental)
 "Kingdom of Rust" (Still Going Remix)
 "Kingdom of Rust" (Still Going Instrumental)
 "Push Me On" (Playgroup Megamix Edit)
 "Push Me On" (Playgroup Megamix)
 "Push Me On" (Playgroup Megadub)
 "Push Me On" (The Glimmers Remix)
 "Jetstream" (Sasha Remix)
 "Jetstream" (Sasha Subdub)
 "Jetstream" (Lindstrøm Remix)
 "Jetstream" (The Time & Space Machine Remix)
 "Compulsion" (Andrew Weatherall Remix)
 "Brazil" (Aeroplane Remix)

Songs on various artists compilations
 "Blackbird" (The Beatles cover) - from Roswell - Original Television Soundtrack (2002), for the US TV series.
 "Willow's Song" - from The Acoustic Album (2006, Virgin Records).
 "There Goes the Fear" (live from Glastonbury 2003) - from the "Q Live from Glastonbury" 14-track compilation, a free give-away CD with the July 2007 edition of Q magazine.
 "There Goes the Fear" - from (500) Days of Summer original motion picture soundtrack (2009).

Sub Sub discography

Albums
Full Fathom Five (Rob's Records, ROB 30, 5 September 1994)
Delta Tapes (Compilation; Cortex Records, 23 February 1998)

Singles & EPs
 "Space Face" (Ten Records, January 1992)
 Coast EP (Rob's Records, ROB 7; June 1992)
 "Ain't No Love (Ain't No Use)" (featuring Melanie Williams) (Rob's Records, ROB 9; 29 March 1993)
 "Respect" (featuring Nina Henchion) (Rob's Records, ROB 19; 7 February 1994)
 "Angel" (featuring Nina Henchion) (Rob's Records, ROB 29; 15 August 1994)
 "Southern Trees" (featuring Gill Jackson) (Rob's Records, ROB 39; 23 January 1995)
 "Smoking Beagles" (featuring Tricky) (Rob's Records, ROB 51; 16 December 1996)
 "This Time I'm Not Wrong" (featuring Bernard Sumner) (Rob's Records, ROB 53; 25 August 1997)

Solo releases

Jimi Goodwin
Odludek (Heavenly, 24 March 2014)

Black Rivers (Jez and Andy Williams)
Black Rivers (Ignition Records, 9 February 2015)

Martin Rebelski
Thanks for Your Thoughts (Heavenly, 3 March 2003)
Stickers on Keys (Heavenly, 29 November 2004)

External links
 Doves discography at Discogs.com
 Sub Sub discography at Discogs.com
 Accurate and up to date info finding Sub Sub's "Delta Tapes" on CD

References

Discographies of British artists
Rock music group discographies